William Derby was an artist.

William Derby may also refer to:

William Derby (fl. 1397), MP for Southwark
William Derby (fl. 1404), MP for Reading

See also
William Bourne de Derby, MP
William Darby (disambiguation)